Dame Vera Stephanie "Steve" Shirley  (previously Brook, née Buchthal; born 16 September 1933) is an information technology pioneer, businesswoman and philanthropist (naturalised British in 1951).

Early life 

Shirley was born as Vera Buchthal to Arnold Buchthal, a judge in Dortmund who was Jewish and who lost his post to the Nazi regime, and a non-Jewish Viennese mother. In July 1939 Shirley arrived, at the age of five together with her nine-year-old sister Renate, in Britain as a Kindertransport child refugee, and recognized how lucky she was to have been saved. She was placed in the care of foster parents living in the Midlands town of Sutton Coldfield. She was later re-united with her biological parents, but said she "never really bonded with them". Shirley attributes her early childhood trauma as being the driving force behind her ability to keep up with changes in her life and career.

After attending a convent school, she moved to Oswestry, near the Welsh border, where she attended the Oswestry Girls' High School. Mathematics was not taught at the school, so she received permission after assessment to take those lessons at the local boys school. She would later recall that, after her Kindertransport and wartime experiences, "in Oswestry I had six wonderful years of peace".

Biography 

After leaving school, Shirley decided not to go to university (botany was the "only science then available to my gender") but sought employment in a mathematics/technical environment. At the age of 18, she became a British citizen and changed her name to Stephanie Brook.

In the 1950s, Shirley worked at the Post Office Research Station at Dollis Hill, building computers from scratch and writing code in machine language. She took evening classes for six years to obtain an honours degree in mathematics. In 1959, she moved to CDL Ltd, designers of the ICT 1301 computer.

After marriage to a physicist, Derek Shirley, in 1959 (d. 2021), Shirley founded, with a capital of £6, the software company Freelance Programmers, (later F International, then Xansa, since acquired by Steria and now part of the Sopra Steria Group). Having experienced sexism in her workplace, "being fondled, being pushed against the wall", she wanted to create job opportunities for women with dependents, and predominantly employed women, with only three male programmers in the first 300 staff, until the Sex Discrimination Act 1975 made that practice illegal. She also adopted the name "Steve" to help her in the male-dominated business world, given that company letters signed using her real name were not responded to. Her team's projects included programming Concorde's black box flight recorder.

She served as an independent non-executive director for Tandem Computers, The Atomic Energy Authority (later AEA Technology) and the John Lewis Partnership.

Shirley retired in 1993 at the age of 60 and has since focused on her philanthropy.

Honours 

Shirley received her BSc in 1956 and was appointed Officer of the Order of the British Empire (OBE) in the 1980 Birthday Honours for services to industry; Dame Commander of the Order of the British Empire (DBE) in the 2000 New Year Honours for services to information technology.; and Member of the Order of the Companions of Honour (CH) in the 2017 Birthday Honours for services to the IT industry and philanthropy.

In 1987, she gained the Freedom of the City of London. She was the first female President of the chartered British Computer Society from 1989 to 1990 and Master of the IT livery company 1992/93. In 1985, she was awarded a Recognition of Information Technology Award. In 1999, she received the Mountbatten Medal.

She was appointed a Fellow of the Royal Academy of Engineering and of Birkbeck College in 2001.

She has donated most of her wealth (from the internal sale to the company staff and later the flotation of FI Group) to charity. Beneficiaries include the Worshipful Company of Information Technologists and the Oxford Internet Institute, part of the Oxford University, through the Shirley Foundation. Her late son Giles (1963–1998) was autistic and she became an early member of the National Autistic Society. She has instigated and funded research in this field, for example through the Autism Research Centre led by Professor Simon Baron-Cohen and via Autistica.

In 2003, Shirley received the Beacon Fellowship Prize for her contribution to autism research and for her pioneering work in harnessing information technology for the public good.

In 1991, Shirley was awarded an honorary doctorate from the University of Buckingham, since then she has been honoured by the University of Cambridge, also in 1994 by Solent University and 28 other UK Universities.

In February 2013, she was assessed as one of the 100 most powerful women in the United Kingdom by Woman's Hour on BBC Radio 4. She was also recognized as one of the BBC's 100 women of 2013.

In January 2014, the Science Council named Shirley as one of the "Top 100 practising scientists" in the UK.

In 2018, she was made a Fellow of the Computer History Museum, and became the first woman to win the lifetime achievement award of the Chartered Management Institute 'for her stellar contribution to British engineering and technology'.

In August 2021, Shirley unveiled a blue plaque in Oswestry commemorating her school years in the town, the plaque is located on The Broadwalk close to St Oswald's Parish Church.

In September 2021 Shirley unveiled a statue by Ian Wolter on Harwich Quay, Essex. It commemorates the arrival of the Kindertransport children at the port.

Philanthropy 

The Shirley Foundation, based in the UK, was set up by Shirley in 1986 with a substantial gift to establish a charitable trust fund which spent out in 2018 in favour of Autistica. Its current mission is facilitation and support of pioneering projects with strategic impact in the field of autism spectrum disorders with particular emphasis on medical research. The fund has supported many projects through grants and loans including: Autism at Kingwood which supports people with autism spectrum disorders to enjoy full and active lives; Prior's Court, the foundation's largest benefaction, with a residential school for 70 autistic pupils and Young Adult Centre for 20 autistic students; Autism99, the first online autism conference attended by 165,000 people from 33 countries. She addresses conferences around the world (many remotely) and is in frequent contact with parents, carers and those with autism spectrum disorders. Her autistic son Giles died following an epileptic seizure at the age of 35.

From May 2009 until May 2010, Shirley served as the UK's Ambassador for Philanthropy, a government appointment aimed at giving philanthropists a "voice".

In 2012, Shirley donated the entirety of her art collection, including works by Elisabeth Frink, Maggi Hambling, Thomas Heatherwick, Josef Herman and John Piper to Prior's Court School and the charity Paintings in Hospitals.

In 2013, appearing on BBC Radio 2's Good Morning Sunday with Clare Balding, Shirley discussed why she had given away more than £67 million of her personal wealth to different projects. In her 2012 memoirs Let IT Go, she writes "I do it because of my personal history; I need to justify the fact that my life was saved."

Sponsored publications

 Design for Disability
 The Art of Prior's Court School
 The History of Autism – Conversations with the Pioneers
 Autism Works

Books

 Let It Go: My Extraordinary Story – From Refugee to Entrepreneur to Philanthropist (with Richard Askwith, 2012, revised 2018) 
My Family in Exile (2015) 
 So To Speak (2020) an anthology of 30 of Dame Stephanie's speeches 
 Ein unmögliches Leben: Die außergewöhnliche Geschichte einer Frau, die die Regeln der Männer brach und ihren eigenen Weg ging (2020)

See also

 Arnold Buchthal
 Dina St Johnston
 Rosa Buchthal
 F International

References

External links

 
 Listen to an oral history interview with Dame Stephanie Shirley – a life story interview recorded for the National Life Stories project Oral History of British Science at the British Library
 IEEE oral history
 
 "Why do ambitious women have flat heads?" (TED2015)

1933 births
Autism activists
BBC 100 Women
English memoirists
English people of Austrian descent
English people of German-Jewish descent
Philanthropists from the West Midlands (county)
English women in business
Dames Commander of the Order of the British Empire
British disability rights activists
English businesspeople
English computer scientists
Fellows of the British Computer Society
Fellows of the Royal Academy of Engineering
Female Fellows of the Royal Academy of Engineering
German people of Austrian descent
Kindertransport refugees
Living people
Naturalised citizens of the United Kingdom
Presidents of the British Computer Society
Members of the Order of the Companions of Honour
Jewish emigrants from Nazi Germany to the United Kingdom
People from Dortmund
People from Sutton Coldfield
People from Oswestry
21st-century women engineers
British health activists
British women memoirists
Fellows of the Academy of Medical Sciences (United Kingdom)
Jewish women philanthropists
Jewish British philanthropists
21st-century English women
21st-century English people